Thomas Francis Daley (November 13, 1884 – December 2, 1934) was a professional baseball player. Daley played for multiple teams during his career. He played for the Cincinnati Reds in 1908, the Philadelphia Athletics in 1912 and 1913, and the New York Yankees in 1914–1915.

Life
Tom Daley was born on November 13, 1884 in Dubois, Pennsylvania. A professional baseball player, he played for multiple teams, including the Cincinnati Reds (1908), the Philadelphia Athletics (1912 and 1913), and the New York Yankees (1914–1915).

He died at the age of 50 in Los Angeles, California on December 2, 1934, and was interred at that city's Calvary Cemetery.

External links

1884 births
1934 deaths
People from DuBois, Pennsylvania
Major League Baseball outfielders
Cincinnati Reds players
Philadelphia Athletics players
New York Yankees players
Baseball players from Pennsylvania
Burlington Pathfinders players
Terre Haute Hottentots players
Los Angeles Angels (minor league) players
Toronto Maple Leafs (International League) players
Vernon Tigers players